Peter C. Klatsky is a Doctor of Medicine specialized in reproductive endocrinology and infertility and an assistant professor at the Albert Einstein College of Medicine. Klatsky who is board certified in his specialty as well as in obstetrics and gynaecology, is also the Founder and CEO of Spring Fertility Management Llc, a San Francisco Bay Area fertility company. Klatsky is a member of the Council on Foreign Relations,  a nonprofit think tank specializing in U.S. foreign policy and international affairs.

Education
In 1998,  Klatsky earned a Bachelor of Arts in political science at Amherst College and  graduated in 2003 with Alpha Omega Alpha honors from The Icahn School of Medicine at Mount Sinai. Then, he completed his residency training at the University of California, San Francisco (UCSF) and an infertility fellowship at Brown University. Later in 2008, Klatsky received a Master's degree in public health (MPH) at Columbia University Mailman School of Public Health.

Career 
Klatsky's scientific work includes single cell molecular genetic analysis and clinical research that has changed practices for patients with fibrosis using advanced reproductive technologies (such as IVF). He is member of the American Board of Obstetrics and Gynecology (certified in obstetrics and gynecology) and the American Board of Obstetrics and Gynecology (certified in reproductive endocrinology and infertility). Klatsky has been invited to make presentations and publications in medical journals and has also worked as a public health and human rights advocate in Southeast Asia, the Amazon, Africa, and New York.

 2015 – Present: Founder, CEO, Spring Fertility Management Llc, San Francisco Bay Area.
 July 2011 – July 2015: Fertility specialist (reproductive endocrinologist), Montefiore Medical Center.
 July 2011 – July 2015: Assistant Professor, Albert Einstein College of Medicine Mentor at Blueprint Health, Blueprint Health LLC.
 January 2011 – March 2012: Physician, Fellowship, Reproductive Endocrinology & Infertility Women & Infants Hospital of Rhode Island.
 July 2008 – June 2011: Providence, Rhode Island Area. Physician and research fellow in infertility, research in advanced molecular genetic tests.
 June 2003 – June 2007:  Physician, residency OBGYN, University of California, San Francisco.
 1998 – 1999: Program intern at EarthRights International.

Publications

During his career, Klatsky  has published several articles in notable scientific medical journals and the Huffington Post.

References

External links
  Peter  Klatsky official page
  Peter  Klatsky Huffington Post page
  Spring Fertility

Living people
Icahn School of Medicine at Mount Sinai alumni
American andrologists
Columbia University Mailman School of Public Health alumni
Year of birth missing (living people)